Geranium rotundifolium, the roundleaf geranium, is a species of annual herb in the family Geraniaceae. They have a self-supporting growth form and are associated with freshwater habitat. They have simple, broad leaves, flowers are visited by sweat bees, Small Carpenter Bees, Myopa, and cabbage butterfly. Individuals can grow to 20 cm tall.

Sources

References 

rotundifolium
Flora of Malta